Adaptive Deep Brain Stimulation, also known as Closed Loop Deep Brain stimulation (clDBS), is a neuro-modulatory technique currently under investigation for the treatment of neurodegenerative diseases.

Conventional DBS delivers constant electrical stimulation to regions of the brain that control movement through a surgically implanted wire, or lead, that is connected to an implantable pulse generator (IPG). Programming adjustments to the pulse generator are frequently made by the treating neurologist based on what the patient is doing and the medication they take over time to optimize the patient’s symptoms. However, it can lead to side effects. Developed by Alberto Priori in 2005, aDBS is a specific type of closed-loop DBS and differs from conventional DBS systems (that provide constant stimulation) in that it can both sense the brain activity and deliver the appropriate stimulation in real time. This technology has been licensed and is developed by Newronika,

Other types of clDBS use different variables and different strategies to adjust stimulation, as in responsive deep brain stimulation.

History in Parkinson’s disease
After being developed in the 1950s, DBS received recognition as a treatment method for tremors and thereafter for the treatment of neurological disorders such as Parkinson’s disease, dystonia, obsessive–compulsive disorder and epilepsy. However, the working mechanism of conventional DBS involved the continuous stimulation of the target structure, which is an approach that cannot adapt to patients’ changing symptoms or functional status in real-time.

Keeping in view this unwanted side effect of DBS, technique with the capability to automatically adjust the stimulation in response to fluctuating biomarkers, was introduced by Priori in 2004. The major problem Priori faced in the development of an aDBS system was the selection of the ideal control variable for feedback. In a study conducted in 2012, he presented several evidence to prove the efficacy and potential benefits of the adaptive DBS (aDBS) guided by local field potentials (LFPs), the brain activity recorded by DBS wires. In 2013 the research group led by Peter Brown applied aDBS for a very short time in patients using a custom made device. At the same time, the Priori group developed and validated an external portable aDBS system prototype aimed to promote clinical investigations in Parkinson's Disease, through clinical testing in freely-moving PD patients with externalized DBS electrodes for two hours, showing the applicability and effectiveness of aDBS. The study, followed by others testing more patients in longer time windows (up to 24 hours) supported the hypothesis that aDBS is effective in controlling PD symptoms while reducing side effects of constant stimulation. The device used in these studies was the external component of the AlphaDBS system developed by Newronika.

While these advancements were ongoing, Medtronic published the architecture of an implantable aDBS device for application in humans. This design was embedded in Medtronic’s Activa PC + S research device, allowing LFP sensing and recording while delivering targeted DBS therapy. This device was used in 2018 by a research team led by Philip A. Starr at the University of California, San Francisco, in a public-private partnership with Medtronic. The researchers inserted the device into two patients with Parkinson's disease who had traditional DBS but continued to experience dyskinesia after adjustment by a neurologist. Later on, they compared the results of the adaptive stimulation system with traditional stimulation set manually on two patients, and found that the adaptive approach was as effective at controlling symptoms as constant stimulation.

The AlphaDBS implantable system by Newronika was developed and CE-marked in 2021. A systematic study was also conducted to highlight safety and efficacy of aDBS vs cDBS using this new generation of DBS IPG in PD.

The AlphaDBS represents a new generation commercially available DBS implantable pulse generator (IPG) for DBS and sensing, with aDBS capabilities.  A systematic multicentre international study consisted of six investigational sites (in Italy, Poland and The Netherlands) was also conducted to highlight safety and efficacy of aDBS vs cDBS using this a new generation of DBS IPG in PD (AlphaDBS system by Newronika SpA, Milan, Italy).[10] 
The Medtronic PC+S device was also developed in a commercial IPG allowing stimulation and sensing, the Percept™ PC, which is approved for aDBS delivery in Japan. Nobutaka Hattori and the group performed a research study, focused on exploring the case of a 51-year-old man with Parkinson's disease (PD) presenting with motor fluctuations, who received bilateral subthalamic deep brain stimulation (DBS) the Percept™ PC device, showing the feasibility of the approach. While these new devices seem to have various applications in terms of facilitating condition-dependent stimulation, and providing new insights into the pathophysiological mechanisms of PD, they are currently under investigation in larger clinical studies, to definitely allow their use in clinical practice

Mechanism of action
In order to adapt to the stimulation parameters, adaptive DBS (aDBS) employs the local field potential (LFP) of the target structure recorded through the implanted electrodes that deliver stimulation. The present application of adaptive DBS (aDBS) technique is primarily based on the detection of increased beta oscillations in the subthalamic nucleus (STN), on account of which it has the capability to change the current depending on the strength of the beta band oscillation, and can, therefore, overcome conventional DBS (cDBS) therapy limitations, including stimulation-induced long term side effects, such as dyskinesia or speech deterioration.

Medical Use

Adaptive Deep Brain Stimulation (aDBS) is a treatment modality that is being studied for the treatment of multiple neuropsychiatric and movement disorders.

Parkinson’s disease (PD) 
Since 2015, Priori performed several experiments to assess the efficacy of aDBS, that uses beta-band power of the subthalamic Local Field Potentials (LFPs) as target to adapt DBS parameters to motor fluctuations. Results of the experiments proved that aDBS is highly effective in controlling the patients PD symptoms in addition to the normal Levodopa therapy, reducing dyskinesias.

Tourette Syndrome (TS) 
Adaptive deep brain stimulation (aDBS) is currently being studied to be used as a potential treatment for TS. A 2017 research study presented a review on the available literature supporting the feasibility of an LFP-based aDBS approach in patients with TS. In addition to that, researchers have put forward several explorative findings regarding LFP data recently acquired and analysed in patients with TS after DBS electrode implantation at rest, during voluntary and involuntary movements (tics), and during ongoing DBS. It was found out that LFPs recorded from DBS targets can be used to control new aDBS devices capable of adaptive stimulation responsive to the symptoms of TS.

Dystonia 
The applications of aDBS in the treatment of dystonia have significantly evolved over the past few years. Low-frequency oscillations (LFO) detected in the internal globus pallidus of dystonia patients have been identified as a physiomarker for adaptive Deep Brain Stimulation (aDBS).[22] Moreover, the characteristics of pallidal low-frequency and beta bursts can be helpful in implementing adaptive brain stimulation in the context of parkinsonian and dystonic internal globus pallidus.[23] A significant amount of scientific research to date on pathological oscillations in dystonia has been focused to address potential biomarkers that might be used as a feedback signal for controlling aDBS in patients with dystonia.[24]

Essential Tremor (ET) 
Adaptive deep brain stimulation (aDBS) may be an effective tool in the treatment of essential tremor (ET), which is one of the most common neurological movement disorders. aDBS for ET is however more focused on a closed-loop technology based on external sensors. In a recent study, H J Chizeck presented the first translation-ready training procedure for a fully embedded aDBS control system for MDs and one of the first examples of such a system in ET.

Comparison with conventional DBS (cDBS) 
In a 2021 research study conducted by Priori, a comparative analysis was presented between the impacts on motor symptoms between conventional deep brain stimulation (cDBS) and closed-loop adaptive deep brain stimulation (aDBS) in patients with Parkinson’s disease. This work highlighted the safety and effectiveness of aDBS stimulation compared to cDBS in a daily session, both in terms of motor performance and TEED to the patient. Simon Little has regarded aDBS approach to be superior to conventional DBS in PD in primates using cortical neuronal spike triggering and in humans employing local field potential biomarkers. While presenting a protocol for a pseudo-randomised clinical study for adaptive deep brain stimulation as advanced Parkinson’s disease treatment, it was shown that aDBS do not induce dysarthria, in contrast to cDBS. Also it has been suggested that aDBS and cDBS can improve patient's axial symptoms to a similar extent, but compared with cDBS, aDBS significantly improves its main symptom, bradykinesia.

References

Electrotherapy
Medical devices
Neurology procedures
Neurosurgical procedures
Neurotechnology